Leaellynasaura (meaning "Leaellyn's lizard") is a genus of small herbivorous ornithischian dinosaurs from the Albian stage of the Early Cretaceous (dated to between 118 and 110 million years ago), first discovered in Dinosaur Cove, Australia. The only known species is Leaellynasaura amicagraphica. It was described in 1989, and named after Leaellyn Rich, the daughter of the Australian palaeontologist couple Tom Rich and Patricia Vickers-Rich who discovered it. The specific name, amicagraphica, translates to "friend writing" and honours both the Friends of the Museum of Victoria and the National Geographic Society for their support of Australian paleontology.

Description

Leaellynasaura is a relatively small dinosaur, about 90 centimeters (3 feet) in length. It is known from several specimens including two nearly complete skeletons and two fragmentary skulls. Herne (2009) argued that, unlike more advanced ornithischians, Leaellynasaura lacked ossified tendons in its tail. He also argued that the tail is noteworthy as among the longest relative to its body size of any ornithischian: the tail was three times as long as the rest of the body combined; it also has more tail vertebrae than any other ornithischians except for some hadrosaurs. However, in a subsequent revision of fossil material attributed to Leaellynasaura Herne (2013) could not confidently assign the postcranial skeletons with long tails (or indeed any fossils other than the holotype incomplete cranium MV P185991, right maxilla MV P186352 and left maxillary tooth MV P186412, all from late Aptian-early Albian Eumeralla Formation) to Leaellynasaura amicagraphica.

Classification
Leaellynasaura has been variously described as a hypsilophodontid, a primitive iguanodontian or a primitive ornithischian (Genasauria). Recent studies have not found a consensus; some analyses describe it as a non-iguanodontian ornithopod, whereas others describe it as a basal neornithischian. A 2019 study recovered it as a member of Elasmaria.

Position according to Herne et al., 2019:

Biology and ecology

Leaellynasaura was an Australian polar dinosaur. At this period in time, Victoria would have been within the Antarctic Circle. Although this latitude is very cold today, it was significantly warmer during the mid-Cretaceous. Because of the Earth's tilt, Leaellynasaura and its contemporaries would still have been living under conditions with extended periods of both daylight and night. Depending on latitude, it is possible that the sun might not have risen for several weeks or months in the winter, which means that Leaellynasaura would have had to live in the dark for perhaps months at a time. A skull fragment interpreted as being from Leaellynasaura has been reported as showing enlarged eyes and the suggestion of proportionally large optic lobes, implying an adaptation to low-light conditions. However, the relatively large orbits of this specimen were more recently interpreted as representing characteristically large eyes of a juvenile individual, rather than any low-light adaptation.

References

 Marthon, Antony, "Dinosaurs Down Underground", Australasian Science Magazine, Oct 2009.

Ornithischian genera
Early Cretaceous dinosaurs of Australia
Albian life
Fossil taxa described in 1989
Taxa named by Patricia Vickers-Rich
Paleontology in Victoria
Ornithopods
Taxa named by Tom Rich